Stanford Wong Video Poker is a 1990 video game published by Villa Crespo Software.

Gameplay
Stanford Wong Video Poker is a game in which the best possibilities and probabilities are shown for video poker.

Reception
Michael S. Lasky reviewed the game for Computer Gaming World, and stated that "Villa Crespo Software has done it again: found a way to make better gamblers out of all of us, while we have fun learning just how to accomplish this seeming impossible feat."

Reviews
Game Players PC Entertainment
Game Players PC Entertainment
Compute!
Electronic Games
Compute!

References

1990 video games
Poker video games